Line 1 of the Bilbao metro is a rapid transit line in Biscay, Basque Country, Spain. It runs from Etxebarri to Plentzia. Its route covers the municipality of Etxebarri, the city of Bilbao, the right bank of the Nervión river and Uribe Kosta. The line has 29 stations.

History

On November 11 1995, Lehendakari José Antonio Ardanza opened the first 23 stations of the metro system between Casco Viejo and Plentzia. The next year, on June 24 1996, Gobela opened as an infill station between Areeta and Neguri, in the municipality of Getxo. On July 5 1997, three new stations were opened: Santutxu, Basarrate and Bolueta; all in Bilbao.

Line 2 of the metro opened in 2002, sharing tracks with the first line between Bolueta and San Inazio. Both lines were extended by one station on 8 January 2005, with the opening of Etxebarri.

The Maidagan level crossing in Getxo, one of the two that remained in the metro, was removed in 2012 by building a tunnel for the metro in the area. The other remaining level crossing was located next to Urduliz station. It closed in 2015, and was rebuilt underground. The new Urduliz station opened in 2017.

On 15 June 2020, Ibarbengoa station (between Bidezabal and Berango) opened to the public. The station was actually built in 2012 (at the same time as the Maidagan level crossing was put underground), but the opening was delayed until its park and ride facilities were built.

Station list

Notes

References

External links 

 Metro Bilbao
 

01
Transport in Bilbao
Railway lines opened in 1995
1995 establishments in the Basque Country (autonomous community)
Metre gauge railways in Spain
1500 V DC railway electrification